The Ukrainian Footballer of the Year is an annual journalist award given by the Ukrainskiy Football ("Ukrainian Football") newspaper to the best professional Ukrainian footballer since 1991. The Ukrainian Footballer of the Year award is given to native Ukrainians.

There is also another award of the best footballer in the Ukrainian Premier League that was established in 1995 by the other newspaper Komanda. That award is not restricted to the Ukrainian nationals as in case of Ukrainian Football, but rather to the Premier League players.

Overview
From 1969 till 1990, the Ukrainian newspaper Molod Ukrainy ("Youth of Ukraine") conducted polls to determine the footballer of the year, and subsequently Ukrainskiy Football took over (which is published by the same publisher as Molod Ukrainy) from 1991. Until 1992 not all players who were honored as the Ukrainian Footballer were Ukrainians such as Yevhen Rudakov, Yuriy Voynov, Oleh Makarov, Vitaliy Starukhin, Vitaliy Holubyev, and Akhrik Tsveiba. Also there were number of "alien" players who did not win the award, but finished in the top three among which are Oleg Salenko, Volodymyr Veremeyev, Adamas Golodets, Viktor Terentiev, Andrei Zazroyev.

Before 1969, a similar award was given out by another Kiev publishers. The very first one was awarded in 1950 by the Football Federation of Ukraine, but its award discontinued in 1960. Since 1960, the honours of awarding player of the year was picked up by the weekly Radyanskyi sport ("Soviet sports"), which in 1965 changed its name to Sportyvna Hazeta ("Sports Gazette"). For unknown reasons, the tradition was interrupted and in 1968 it was given out by another former Kievan Russian language newspaper Komsomolskoe znamya ("Banner of the Communist Union of Youth"), which announced both Vasyl Turyanchyk and Volodymyr Muntyan as the best players of Ukraine, then the Ukrainian Soviet Socialist Republic. As with the "Sportyvna Gazeta", it is unknown whether the newspaper continued to conduct such polls following years, but it is certain that this tradition was picked up by a Ukrainian language, Kiev-based newspaper Molod Ukrainy ("Youth of Ukraine") that conducted the voting since 1969 on regular basis.

Recipients

Ukrainian Research Institute of Physical Culture

Central House of Physical Culture of Ukraine

Football (Hockey) Federation (Section) of Ukraine

Sportyvna Hazeta (Radyanskyi Sport)

Komsomolskoye Znamie

Molod Ukrainy

Ukrainskiy Football (newspaper)

Ukrainskiy Football (website)

Alternative awards

Footballer of the Year (Ukrainian clubs)

Kiev Institute of Physical Culture

Ukrainian Premier League Footballer of the Year

Football Federation of Ukraine

Komanda award (1995–2016)
The Komanda award for the best footballer in the Ukrainian Premier League was established in 1995 by the Komanda newspaper. It is actually called the Ukrainian Premier League Footballer of the Year (Vyscha Liha Footballer of the Year before 2008). It is being evaluated by the participants of the League, players and coaches.

Komanda also runs a list The best 33 football players of Ukraine (33 найкращі футболісти України) as an annual composed list of the three best football (soccer) players in each position (amplua) for the annual calendar. This is based on the Spisok 33 (:ru:Список 33 лучших футболистов сезона в СССР) which ran in the Soviet era until 1992, when it became the Russian league List of 33 (:ru:Список 33 лучших футболистов чемпионата России).

Komanda1 award

See also
Soviet Footballer of the Year
Heroes of Sports Year (Ukraine)

References

External links
Ukraine - Player of the Year Awards, rsssf.com.

Ukrainian football trophies and awards
Association football player of the year awards by nationality
Awards established in 1922
1922 establishments in Ukraine